The 1999 Indian general election in Maharashtra was held in three phases on 6, 7 and 8 September 1999.

These were held for 48 seats with the state going to polls in the first three phases of the general elections. The major contenders in the state were the United Progressive Alliance (UPA) and National Democratic Alliance (NDA). UPA consisted of the Indian National Congress and the Nationalist Congress Party whereas the NDA consisted of the Bharatiya Janata Party and the Shiv Sena.

Results

Results by Alliance

List of elected MPs

Results by region 

List of Elected MPs:

1998 Indian general election
Indian general elections in Maharashtra